Buffalo, Tennessee may refer to the following places in Tennessee:
Buffalo, Anderson County, Tennessee, an unincorporated community
Buffalo, Hickman County, Tennessee, an unincorporated community
Buffalo, Humphreys County, Tennessee, an unincorporated community
Buffalo, Sullivan County, Tennessee, an unincorporated community